Anna Maria van Schurman  (November 5, 1607 – May 4, 1678) was a Dutch painter, engraver, poet, and scholar, who is best known for her exceptional learning and her defence of female education. She was a highly educated woman, who excelled in art, music, and literature, and became proficient in fourteen languages, including Latin, Greek, Hebrew, Arabic, Syriac, Aramaic, and Ethiopic, as well as various contemporary European languages. She was the first woman to unofficially study at a Dutch university.

Life

Van Schurman was born in Cologne, a daughter of wealthy parents, Frederik van Schurman, from Antwerp (d. 1623) and Eva von Harff de Dreiborn. At four years old she could read. When she was six, she had mastered creating highly intricate paper cut-outs that surpassed every other child her age. At the age of ten, she learned embroidery in three hours. In some of her writings, she talks about how she invented the technique of sculpting in wax, saying, "I had to discover many things which nobody was able to teach me." Her self-portrait wax sculpture was so lifelike, especially the necklace, that her friend, the Princess of Nassau, had to prick one with a pin just to be sure it was not real. Between 1613 and 1615, her family moved to Utrecht, and about ten years later they moved again, this time to Franeker in Friesland. From about 11 years old, Schurman was taught Latin and other subjects by her father along with his sons, an unusual decision at a time when girls in noble families were not generally tutored in the classics. To learn Latin she was given Seneca to read by her father. The private education and self-study were complemented through correspondence and discussions with notables such as André Rivet and Friedrich Spanheim, both professors of Leiden University, and the family's neighbour Gisbertus Voetius, a professor at the University of Utrecht. She excelled at painting, paper-cutting, embroidery, and wood carving. Another art form that she experimented with was calligraphy, which she learned just from looking at a model-book. Once she mastered that, she invented styles that allowed her to write in many of the languages she knew. After her father's death, the family moved back to Utrecht in 1626. In her 20s, Schurman's home became a meeting point for intellectuals. Among her friends were Constantijn Huygens, Johan van Beverwijck, Jacob de Witt, Cornelius Boy, Margaretha van Godewijk and Utricia Ogle. In the 1630s she studied engraving with Magdalena van de Passe. Combining the techniques of engraving with her skills in calligraphy, her renowned engraved calligraphy pieces gained the attention of all who saw them, including her contemporaries. Despite her playfulness and experimentation, Anna Maria was very serious about her art, and her contemporaries knew it. She herself said that she was "immensely gifted by God in the arts."

In 1634, due to her distinction in Latin, she was invited to write a poem for the opening of the University of Utrecht. In the poem she celebrated the city of Utrecht and the new university. She noted the potential for the university to help the city cope with the economic impacts of the floods and the shifting course of the river Rhine. She also challenged the exclusion of women from the university. In response to her complaint, the university authorities allowed her to attend professor Voetius' lectures. In 1636 she became the first female student at the university, or at any Dutch university. Women at that time were not permitted to study at a university in Protestant Netherlands, and when she attended lectures she sat behind a screen or in a curtained booth so that the male students could not see her. At the university she studied Hebrew, Arabic, Chaldee, Syriac and Ethiopian.  Her interest in philosophy and theology and her artistic talent contributed to her fame and reputation as the "Star of Utrecht". By the 1640s she was fluent in 14 languages and wrote in Latin, Greek, Hebrew, Italian, French, Arabic, Persian, Ethiopian, German and Dutch.

According to her contemporary Pierre Yvon, Schurman had an excellent command of mathematics, geography and astronomy. The pious young scholar appears to have had a number of suitors. After his wife died in 1631, Constantijn Huygens asked for Schurman's hand in marriage and wrote 10 poems in three languages to her in 1634. Huygens was teased by other Dutch intellectuals. Schurman's commitment to celibacy and her studies seemed to be unwavering. When she chose the phrase Amor Meus Crucifixus Est (My Love Has Been Crucified) as her motto, her intellectual friends were convinced that her choice not to marry was rooted in her piety, rather than her scholarship.

Schurman produced delicate engravings by using a diamond on glass, sculpture, wax modelling, and the carving of ivory and wood. She painted, especially portraits, becoming the first known Dutch painter to use pastel in a portrait. She gained honorary admission to the St. Luke Guild of painters in 1643, signalling public recognition of her art.

Schurman corresponded with the Danish noblewoman Birgitte Thott, who translated classical authors and religious writings. Thott's translation of Seneca's philosophical works included a preface in which she argued for women's right to study. Thott stated that she translated classical works because few women were able to read Latin. Schurman publicly praised Thott and called her the "tenth Muse of the North". Schurman through correspondence established a network of learned women across Europe. A frequent topic in this correspondence was the education of women. Schurman in the correspondence expressed her admiration for educated women like Lady Jane Gray and Queen Elizabeth I.

An unauthorised version of Schurman's writings on women's education was published in 1638 in Paris under the title Dissertatio De Ingenii Muliebris ad Doctrinam, & meliores Litteras aptitudine. As the unauthorised collection of her writings circulated, Schurman decided to publish an authoritative Latin treatise in 1641. In 1657 the treatise was published in English under the title The Learned Maid or, Whether a Maid may be a Scholar.

The Labadists 

In her 60s Schurman emerged as one of the principal leaders of the Labadists. In the 1660s Schurman had become increasingly disillusioned with the Reformed Churches in the Netherlands. She made the reformation of the church her goal. Along with corresponding with ministers, she travelled throughout the country and organised meetings with them. She lamented the lack of spiritual devotion and the "exhibits of the ecclesiastics" that occupied the church's pulpits.

In 1661 Schurman's brother studied theology with the Hebrew scholar Johannes Buxtorf in Basel and learned about the defrocked French priest Jean de Labadie. He travelled to Geneva to meet him. In 1662 he corresponded with Schurman at length about Labadie's teachings. When Labadie and a small number of followers stopped over in Utrecht on the way to Middelburg, they lodged in Schurman's house. Labadie became the pastor of Middelburg, preaching millenarianism, arguing for moral regeneration and that believers should live apart from unbelievers. Schurman supported him even when he was removed as a pastor. When in late 1669 Labadie settled in Amsterdam to establish a separatist church, Schurman sold her house and part of her library. She joined Labadie's sectarian community. In March 1669 she broke with the Reformed Church when she published a 10-page pamphlet On the Reformation necessary at present in the Church of Christ. She denounced the church men for trampling on "celestial wisdom", arguing that the people of God should be separated from the "mondains" through "hatred of the world" and "divine love".

A public smear campaign followed. Schurman was attacked by her intellectual friends, including Huygens and Voetius. Her writing style became forthright and confident. When the Labadists had to leave Amsterdam, Schurman secured an invitation from her friend Princess Elisabeth of Bohemia, who in 1667 had become abbess at the Lutheran Damenstift of Herford Abbey. The 50 Labadists lived there between 1670 and 1672. At Herdford Schurman continued her art work and the Labadists maintained a printing press. Schurman was referred to by the Labadists as Mama, Labadie as Papa. Rumours had it that Labadie and Schurman had married; however, he married Lucia van Sommelsdijck. In 1772 the Labadists moved to Altona in Denmark, as Elisabeth of Bohemia had advocated on their behalf in correspondence with the King of Denmark. In 1673 Schurman published Eukleria, or Choosing the Better Part, a reference to Luke 10:42 when Mary chooses the better part by sitting at the feet of Christ. In it she derided Gisbertus Voetius's opposition to her admiration for Saint Paula, a disciple of St Jerome, who had helped to translate the Bible into Latin. Voetius argued that women should have a limited public role and that anything else was feminine impropriety.

When Labadie died in 1674 Schurman investigated the possibility of moving to England, corresponding with the Latin scholar Lucy Hutchinson and the theologian John Owen on the matter. But the Labadists moved to the village Wieuwerd in Friesland and attracted numerous new members, including Maria Sibylla Merian. About 400 Labadists practiced absolute detachment from worldly values. They attempted to return to early church practices, sharing all property. In the final years of her life Schurman was housebound due to severe rheumatism. She continued to write, keeping up correspondence and working on the second part of Eukleria. She died aged 70 in 1678.

Published writings 

Many of Schurman's writings were published during her lifetime in multiple editions, although some of her writings have been lost. Her most famous book was the Nobiliss. Virginis Annae Mariae a Schurman Opuscula Hebraea Graeca Latina et Gallica, Prosaica et Metrica (Minor works in Hebrew, Greek, Latin and French in prose and poetry by the most noble Anne Maria van Schurman). It was published 1648 by Friedrich Spanheim, professor of theology at Leiden University through the Leiden-based publisher Elzeviers.

Schurman's The Learned Maid or, Whether a Maid may be a Scholar grew out of her correspondence on women's education with theologians and scholars across Europe. In it she advances Jane Grey as an example of the value of female education. Schurman argued that educating women in languages and the Bible would increase their love of God. While an increasing number of royal and wealthy families chose to educate their daughters, girls and women did not have formal access to education. Schurman argued that "A Maid may be a Scholar... The assertion may be proved both from the property of the form of this subject; or the rational soul: and from the very acts and effects themselves. For it is manifest that Maids do actually learn any arts and science." In arguing that women had rational souls she foreshadowed the Cartesian argument for human reason, underpinning her assertion that women had a right to be educated. Schurman and René Descartes corresponded, and while they disagreed on the interpretation of the Bible they both thought that reason was central in the human identity.

The Learned Maid included correspondence with the theologian André Rivet. In her correspondence with Rivet, Schurman explained that women such as Marie de Gournay had already proven that man and woman are equal, so she would not "bore her readers with repetition". Like Rivet, Schurman argued in The Learned Maid for education on the basis of moral grounds, because "ignorance and idleness cause vice". But Schurman also took the position that "whoever by nature has a desire for arts and science is suited to arts and science: women have this desire, therefore women are suited to arts and science". However, Schurman did not advocate for universal education, or the education for women of the lower classes. She took the view that ladies of upper classes should have access to higher education. Schurman made the point that women could make a valuable contribution to society, and argued that it was also necessary for their happiness to study theology, philosophy and the sciences. In reference to The Learned Maid, Rivet cautioned her in a letter that "although you have shown us this with grace, your persuasions are futile... You may have many admirers, but none of them agree with you."

Engravings 

When Anna Maria van Schurman demonstrated her artistic talent early on, her father sent her to study with the famous engraver, Magdalena van de Passe, in the 1630s. Her first known engraving was a self-portrait, created in 1633. She found it difficult to depict hands and thus found ways to hide them in all of her self-portraits. In another self-portrait engraving she created in 1640, she included the Latin inscription "Cernitis hic picta nostros in imagine vultus: si negat ars formā[m], gratia vestra dabit." This translates in English to "See my likeness depicted in this portrait: May your favor perfect the work where art has failed."

Published works
Incomplete list
"De Vitæ Termino" (On the End of Life). Published in Leiden, 1639. Translated into Dutch as "Pael-steen van den tijt onses levens," published in Dordrecht, 1639.
  Paris, 1638, and Leiden, 1641. Translated into many languages, including Dutch, French (1646), and English (1659), entitled "The Learned Maid or, Whether a Maid may be a Scholar." 
This work argued, using the medieval technique of syllogism, that women should be educated in all matters but should not use their education in professional activity or employment and it should not be allowed to interfere in their domestic duties. For its time this was a radical position.
 
This is an edition of her collected works, including correspondence in French, Latin, Greek and Hebrew, were published by the house of Elsevier, edited by Friedrich Spanheim, another disciple of Labadie. Volume was reprinted in 1650, 1652, 1723 and 1749.
  (Euklēría, or Choosing the Better Part). Translated into Dutch and German. 
This is a defense of her choice to follow Labadie and a theological tract.

Tributes
Judy Chicago's feminist artwork The Dinner Party (1979) features a place setting for van Schurman.
Between 2000 and 2018, a marble bust of van Schurman was situated in the atrium of the House of Representatives of the Dutch Parliament in The Hague.
Van Schurman's name is shown on a blackboard showing a list of the most worthy people for a new version of The Good Place in episode 11 of the fourth season.

Further reading
Pieta van Beek: The first female university student: A.M.van Schurman, Utrecht 2010, 280p. free PDF 
Bo Karen Lee: I wish to be nothing: the role of self-denial in the mystical theology of A. M. van Schurman in: Women, Gender and Radical Religion in Early Modern Europe. Ed. Sylvia Brown. Leiden: 2008, 27 S. online at google-books
Katharina M. Wilson and Frank J. Warnke (eds.), Women Writers of the Seventeenth Century, Athens: U. of Georgia Press, (1989) pp 164–185
Mirjam de Baar et al. (eds.), Choosing the Better Part. Anna Maria van Schurman (1607-1678), Dordrecht, Boston, London: Kluwer Academic Publishers, (1996).
Mirjam de Baar: Gender, genre and authority in seventeenth-century religious writing: Anna Maria van Schurman and Antoinette Bourignon as contrasting examples, 30p. free PDF
Anne R. Larsen, "Anna Maria van Schurman, 'The Star of Utrecht': The Educational Vision and Reception of a Savante", [Women and Gender in the Early Modern World], Abingdon: Routledge, 2016.
Anna Maria van Schurman, Whether a Christian Woman Should Be Educated and Other Writing from Her Intellectual Circle, ed and trans by Joyce Irwin, Chicago 1998, online at google-books
Lennep, J, Herman F. C. Kate, and W P. Hoevenaar. Galerij Van Beroemde Nederlanders Uit Het Tijdvak Van Frederik Hendrik. Utrecht: L.E. Bosch en Zoon, 1868.
Martine van Elk, Early Modern Women's Writing: Domesticity, Privacy, and the Public Sphere in England and the Dutch Republic, Cham: Palgrave/Springer, 2017 .

See also
List of Orientalist artists
Orientalism

References

Sources
annamariavanschurman.org (by Pieta van Beek)
A.M.Schurman in "Other Women's Voices"
National Gallery – Jan Lievens' portrait of Anna Maria van Schurman

External links

1607 births
1678 deaths
17th-century Dutch poets
17th-century Dutch philosophers
17th-century engravers
17th-century German poets
17th-century women artists
17th-century Dutch women writers
17th-century writers
Dutch classical scholars
Dutch Golden Age painters
Dutch women painters
Dutch women philosophers
Dutch women poets
Dutch wood engravers
Feminism and history
Feminist writers
German women philosophers
German philosophers
German women poets
Glass engravers
Orientalist painters
Artists from Cologne
Artists from Utrecht
Protestant philosophers
Women engravers
Women classical scholars
17th-century Latin-language writers
New Latin-language poets
Dutch glass artists